The All India Football Federation (AIFF) is the national governing body of football in India. It is a member of FIFA, the international governing body of football and affiliated to Asian Football Confederation.

It is affiliated to Ministry of Youth Affairs and Sports of Government of India and a member of South Asian Football Federation. India men's and women's football teams, who are governed by the AIFF, represent India in various international football tournaments.

The AIFF manage, sanctions, conducts, schedules and runs all national level football tournaments and leagues in India, including major tournaments Indian Super League, I-League and Super Cup. The federation also indirectly manages local football competitions through its member state associations. 

AIFF's Beach soccer and Futsal sport committees oversee development of Beach soccer and Futsal sports respectively in India.

History
Before the formation of the All India Football Federation (AIFF), the de facto ruling body for association football in India were the Indian Football Association (IFA). The IFA was founded in 1893 and ran the game in the Bengal region. The federation was mainly governed by Englishmen and served as the most powerful football body in the country during the early 20th century.

Efforts to form a countrywide football federation were started in 1935 by the IFA when the federation, as well as seven other associations, met at a conference but no consensus could be reached. After differences in opinions and other conflicts were resolved, a meeting was conducted in March 1937 which would serve to be the beginning of the start of the AIFF. The AIFF was officially founded on 23 June 1937 after representatives from the nine regional football associations met at the Army Headquarters in Shimla. Namely, the nine regional football associations were the IFA, Army Sports Control Board, North West India Football Association, Bihar Olympic Association, WIFA, Madras Football Association, United Provinces Sports Control Board, Mysore Football Association, and Ajmer and Mewar Football Association.

After the launch of the national football federation, the idea of an India national football team did not gain much momentum until after India gain independence in 1947. Select Indian teams did participate in tours of Australia, Burma, Afghanistan, and South Africa but none were officially part of the national team. In 1948, one year after independence and 11 since forming as a football association, the AIFF gained affiliation with FIFA, the governing body for football around the world. Later that year, the national team was officially formed and participated in their first official tournament, the 1948 Summer Olympics. 

In 1950, the national team automatically qualified for the 1950 FIFA World Cup which was to be held in Brazil after all the teams in India's qualification group withdrew. However, prior to the tournament, India withdrew, citing the reason as due to lack of funding. Other reasons given for India's withdrawal included that the AIFF valued the Summer Olympics more than FIFA World Cup at that time and that the players playing mainly barefooted, though the later is just a tale. In 1952, during the Olympics in Finland, India was defeated in the first round by Yugoslavia 10–1. This defeat made the AIFF make it mandatory for players on the national team to wear football boots. In 1954, the AIFF played an active role in promoting football in Asia when they were one of the founding members of the Asian Football Confederation. India took part in four straight Olympic football tournaments between 1948 and 1960 but have failed to qualify since. In 1985, India started to participate in World Cup qualifiers again but have failed to make it to the tournament.

In 1977, the AIFF started the Federation Cup which was the first club based national tournament in the country. The Santosh Trophy, the national tournament for state teams, was started in 1941.

In 1996, the AIFF began the first national league in the country, the semi-professional National Football League. Before this, most clubs played in state leagues or select nationwide tournaments.

In 2006, the AIFF reformatted the league as the I-League in an effort to professionalise the game. However, during the following seasons, the league suffered from a lack of popularity due to poor marketing.

In September 2006, the AIFF signed a 10-year television and media contract with Zee Sports. The deal would make Zee broadcast the National Football League, later the I-League, and other tournaments organised by the AIFF and selected India's international matches. However, in October 2010, the deal between the AIFF and Zee Sports was terminated after differences between both parties related to payment and marketing of football in India.

On 9 December 2010, it was announced that the AIFF had signed a new 15-year, ₹700 crore deal with Reliance Industries and the International Management Group.

Competitions

International
 Intercontinental Cup (senior men's)
 Women's Gold Cup (senior women's)
 Subroto Cup (inter-school)

Domestic

Men's 
 Indian Super League
 I-League
 I-League 2
 Super Cup
 Durand Cup
 Santosh Trophy (inter-state)
 Futsal Club Championship
 National Beach Soccer Championship (inter-state)

Men's youth 
 RF Development League (U-21) 
 Elite League (U-18)
 Junior League (U-15) 
 Sub-Junior League (U-13)
 B.C. Roy Trophy (U-19) (inter-state)
 Mir Iqbal Hussain Trophy (U-16) (inter-state)

Women's
 Indian Women's League
 Senior Women's National Football Championship (inter-state)

Women's youth
 Junior Girl's National Football Championship (U-19/17) (inter-state)
 Sub–Junior Girl's National Football Championship (U-16) (inter-state)

Current title holders

State leagues list

Men's
 Arunachal Super League
 Assam State Premier League
 Bangalore Super Division (Karnataka)
 Calcutta Football League (West Bengal)
 Chennai Football League (Tamil Nadu)
 FAO League (Odisha)
 FD Senior Division (Delhi)
 Goa Professional League
 Gujarat SFA Club Championship
 J&K Premier Football League
 Kerala Premier League
 Lucknow Super Division (Uttar Pradesh)
 Madhya Pradesh Premier League
 Manipur State League
 Mizoram Premier League
 Mumbai Football League (Maharashtra)
 Nagaland Premier League
 Punjab State Super Football League
 Rajasthan State Men's League
 Shillong Premier League (Meghalaya)
 Sikkim Premier Division League
 Uttarakhand Super League

Women's
 Calcutta Women's Football League (West Bengal)
 FD Women's League (Delhi)
 Goa Women's League
 Karnataka Women's League
 Kerala Women's League
 Manipur Women's League
 Odisha Women's League
 Punjab Women's League
 SSA Women's Football League (Meghalaya)
 Tamil Nadu Women's League
 WIFA Women's Football League (Maharashtra)

National teams

Men
 India national football team
 India national under-23 football team
 India national under-20 football team
 India national under-17 football team
 India national beach soccer team
 India national futsal team

Women
 India women's national football team
 India women's national under-20 football team
 India women's national under-17 football team

Affiliated state federations

There are currently 37 state associations affiliated with the All India Football Federation.

Administration (Executive committee and others)

Board of directors
The following are on the board of the directors at the AIFF.

Technical committee
 IM Vijayan – Chairperson
 Monoranjan Bhattacharya – Deputy Chairperson
 Eugeneson Lyngdoh
 Climax Lawrence
 Harjinder Singh
 Arun Malhotra
 Pinky Bompal Magar

League committee
 Lalnghinglova Hmar – Chairman
 Santanu Pujari – Deputy Chairman
 Arif Ali
 Amit Chaudhary
 Dr. Reginold Vargese
 KP Singh
 Kiran Chowgule
 M Satyanarayan
 Nizamuddin

Development committee
 Avijit Paul – Chairman
 Mulrajsinh Chudasama – Deputy Chairman
 Vijay Bali
 Ratankumar Singh Moirangthem
 S. Dhanasegar
 Muhammed Rafeek TKM
 Liaqat Ali
 Jesiah Villavarayar
 Mohd. Shahid

Beach Soccer committee
 Jignesh Patil – Chairman
 KI Nizammudin – Deputy Chairman
 Anup Patra
 Bruno Coutinho
 Md. Ikram
 Upen Patel
 Dilip Singh Shekhawat
 Sanjay Mehshack
 Santosh Kumar
 G.P. Palguna

Futsal committee
 Vijay Bali – Chairman
 Amit Khemani – Deputy Chairman
 Kuljit Singh
 Lalrengpuia
 Syed Husnain Ali Naqvi
 Ravinder Prasad Singh
 Naresh Singh Rana
 S Achu
 BS Mehra
 Chung Chung Bhutia
 Mohammad Shahid Jabbar

Advisory Committee
 Shabbir Ali – Chairperson
 GP Palguna – Deputy Chairperson
 Gurdev Singh
 Atanu Bhattacharya
 Irungbam Surkumar Singh
 Victor Manjila
 RP Singh
 Arun Singh Rajput

Other members
 Valanka Natasha Alemão – Chairperson, Women's Committee
 Thongam Tababi Devi – Deputy Chairperson, Women's Committee
 Anil Kumar P. – Chairperson, Competitions Committee 
 Amit Dey – In-Charge of Futsal 
 Menla Ethenpa – Finance
 Savio Medeira – Head of Coach Education
 Baichung Bhutia
 Malojiraje Chhatrapati
 Mohan Lal
 K. Neibou Sekhose
 Deepak Sharma
 Syed Imtiaz Husain
 Syed Hasnain Ali Naqvi

Notes:

Past office bearers

Presidents
The following is a list of presidents of AIFF:

Secretaries-General
The following is a list of secretaries of AIFF:

Controversies 
Politicians are highly involved in AIFF. From 1988 to 2009, Congress party's Priya Ranjan Dasmunsi was president of AIFF.  After him his fellow, then Congress and later Nationalist Congress Party's politician Praful Patel became president and run it from 2009 to 2022 in an authoritarian manner. He was removed from the position by Supreme Court of India in May 2022 and a three members' committee was appointed to run AIFF. In their decision the judge remarked that the present state of this organisation is not in the interest of proper governence. Patel remained president of the AIFF for 16 years, without any tenure limit. He held the position in 3 terms. As per AIFF, some people dictate Indian football who serve themselves in the expenses of football sport and players. According to The Telegraph newspaper's article, there is rampant and open corruption in the All India Football Federation (AIFF) and due to lots of sponsor do not want to sponsor AIFF or associated with it. And Players, coaches and officials related to football feels that the AIFF's attitude and management of this organisation have to be change, otherwise football will not improve in India. 

As of 6 October 2021, since 2020 AIFF avoided elections to new president and office holders. Praful Patel is president of AIFF since 2009 and held president's post even after his legal presidency period ended. 

Multiple times, FIFA have accused AIFF of outside influence in it. On 15 August 2022, FIFA suspended the federation for violating its statutes on third-party interference. India was stripped off its hosting rights for international football tournaments, including the 2022 FIFA U-17 Women's World Cup scheduled for October 2022. The Suspension was lifted on 27 August 2022. As a result, 2022 FIFA U-17 Women's World Cup scheduled for October 2022 were held as planned. 

This organisation is often accused for neglecting women's football. 

The Indian men's national football team has never played in the FIFA World Cup but India did qualify for the 1950 FIFA World Cup which was held in Brazil. In 1950 FIFA World Cup qualification, the other teams in India's qualification group withdrew due to various reasons and India qualified as the remaining team. However, the Indian team did not participate and withdrew their name. A common myth is that India withdrew and didn't participate because FIFA did not allowed Indians to play football barefoot. According to author and sports journalist Jaydeep Basu, this is completely wrong and India did not participate because AIFF did not believe that its players had the calibre to compete against the top teams of the world. Furthermore, AIFF used to consider the Olympics to be more important tournament than the FIFA World Cup.

See also

 AIFF Player of the Year
 Indian football league system

References

External links
 Official AIFF website 
 India at FIFA.com
 India at The-AFC.com 

 
1937 establishments in India
 
Futsal in India
Sports organizations established in 1937
India